The Jay Scott Prize is an annual film award presented by the Toronto Film Critics Association, in conjunction with commercial sponsor Stella Artois, to an emerging talent in the Canadian film industry. 

First presented in 2009, the award was named in memory of influential Canadian film critic Jay Scott. The award has been most commonly presented to film directors, but has also been given to actors; it is generally given to a filmmaker or performer who has achieved a significant career breakthrough in the previous year, but is ultimately given in consideration of the recipient's overall body of work rather than for that specific work.

The winner of the award receives $10,000.

Sponsors
From 2009 to 2012, the prize was sponsored by Deluxe. From 2013 to 2015, the prize was sponsored by Scotiabank. As of 2016, the prize is sponsored by Anheuser-Busch InBev, brewers of Stella Artois, and is now known as the Stella Artois Jay Scott Prize.

Winners
2009: Xavier Dolan
2010: Daniel Cockburn
2011: Ingrid Veninger
2012: Nicolás Pereda
2013: Matt Johnson
2014: Albert Shin
2015: Anne Émond
2016: Ashley McKenzie
2017: Sofia Bohdanowicz
2018: Molly McGlynn
2019: Deragh Campbell
2020: Kelly Fyffe-Marshall
2021: Bretten Hannam
2022: Carol Nguyen

References

External links

Toronto Film Critics Association Awards